The Cremorne Railway Bridge crosses the Yarra River three kilometres south-east of Melbourne connecting Richmond and South Yarra stations on the Frankston, Pakenham, Cranbourne, and Sandringham railway lines.

History
The first bridge on the site was a double-track structure, opened in December 1860 by the Melbourne and Suburban Railway Company. In 1886, a second double-track bridge was opened alongside the first, thereby allowing a four-track section of line to be provided between Richmond and South Yarra. The present bridge was opened in 1946. It accommodated three pairs of tracks between Richmond and South Yarra, although the two extra tracks were not constructed until 1960.

References

Bridges in Melbourne
Bridges over the Yarra River
Bridges completed in 1946
1946 establishments in Australia
Railway bridges in Victoria (Australia)
Transport in the City of Yarra
Buildings and structures in the City of Stonnington
Transport in the City of Stonnington